The Crispi III government of Italy held office from 15 December 1893 until 14 June 1894, a total of 181 days, or 5 months and 30 days.

Government parties
The government was composed by the following parties:

Composition

References

Italian governments
1893 establishments in Italy